Tommy Smith (born November 4, 1954), formerly known as 'The Outlaw' and 'TC Starr', was a radio DJ in Little Rock, Arkansas. Tommy is most known for his first long-running morning show "The Rock and Roll Breakfast" with co-host David "Big Dave" Medford at Magic 105 (105.1 FM), as well as his second long-running morning show "The Show With No Name" with co-hosts Roger Scott and David Bazzel on KABZ 103.7 The Buzz. Smith is a 1972 graduate of Little Rock Central High School, and a veteran of the U.S. Air Force. After announcing his impending retirement shortly after the 2021 new year, Tommy decided that Dec 31st would be his final show. After he retired, country music superstar Justin Moore became the new co-host of the morning show on The Buzz, and it was renamed "Morning Mayhem". Fans still refer to Smith as "Outlaw", and he is considered a legend in central Arkansas radio. Smith has been married for many years to his wife Karen.

On-air collapse
On September 24, 2010 Smith was taken to a hospital after he collapsed during a broadcast of his "Show With No Name". An interview on his struggle with drinking and his life aired on KATV Channel 7, Little Rock, Arkansas.

Arrest
Smith was arrested Thursday May 26, 2011 for several offenses including driving under the influence, possession of a controlled substance, drinking in public, failure to stop after an accident, refusal to submit to a chemical test, crossing the median, and following too close.

Tommy Smith has now recovered after rehabilitation at the Betty Ford Center, and continued as the morning DJ for 103.7 The Buzz in Little Rock, Arkansas until his retirement on December 31, 2021 after forty years in the industry.

References

External links
Website
Arkansas online

People from Little Rock, Arkansas
Living people
1954 births
American DJs